is a trans-Neptunian object and damocloid on a highly eccentric, cometary-like orbit. It was first observed on 6 September 2002, by astronomers with the Lincoln Near-Earth Asteroid Research at the Lincoln Lab's ETS near Socorro, New Mexico, in the United States. It has the second highest orbital eccentricity of any known minor planet, after .

Description 

 may be a dormant comet that has not been seen outgassing. In the past it may have made closer approaches to the Sun that could have removed most near-surface volatiles. It orbits the Sun at a distance of 2.7–1,091 AU once every 12783 years (semi-major axis of 546.7 AU). Its orbit has an eccentricity of 0.9951 and an inclination of 58° with respect to the ecliptic. The body's observation arc begins with a precovery observation at Lincoln Laboratory's Experimental Test Site on 16 August 2002, or three weeks prior to its first observation. The observation arc only spans over 80 days. The object has not been observed since November 2002 about 2 months before it came to perihelion 2.7 AU from the Sun. During perihelion passage the object was 2.9 AU from Earth.

 belongs to the dynamical group of damocloids due to its low Tisserand parameter (TJupiter of 1.0820). It is also a Jupiter-, Saturn-, Uranus-, and Neptune-crosser. The object has the seventh-largest heliocentric semi-major axis and aphelion of all known minor planets, while its extreme eccentricity brings it well within the orbit of Jupiter when at perihelion.

See also 
 List of Solar System objects by greatest aphelion

References

External links 
 

Damocloids
Trans-Neptunian objects

Minor planet object articles (unnumbered)
20020816